Ruiz Foods is an American food production and service company based in Dinuba, California, founded in 1964 by Louis Ruiz and his son, Fred.  As of April 2010, it was the top seller of frozen Mexican dishes in the US and Canada.  Under the brand names of El Monterey and Tornados it produces around 200 frozen Mexican foods for grocery stores throughout the US and Canada.  These foods include burritos, taquitos, enchiladas, and tamales.  Ruiz Foods' main 300,000 sq ft (28,000 m2) manufacturing facility meets the needs of the Eastern and Midwestern US with two more facilities in Texas.

References

External links

 

Food manufacturers of the United States
Food and drink companies established in 1964
1964 establishments in California
Companies based in Tulare County, California
Food and drink companies based in California
Hispanic and Latino American cuisine
Hispanic and Latino American culture in California
Latin American cuisine
American companies established in 1964